Devil's Kitchen is a small cave on the southwestern shore of Mackinac Island in Michigan, USA.  The cave was carved during the Nipissing post-glacial period by the waves of Lake Huron.  It consists of two hollows in a rocky cliff, one directly on top of the other.

Mackinac Island's brecciated limestone has eroded into a variety of unusual formations.  The cave's appearance is comparable to that of a human face with an open mouth.

Although shallow, Devil's Kitchen is much visited because of its location within Mackinac Island State Park on M-185, the state highway that circles Mackinac Island.  Local stories allege that the Native Americans of the Straits of Mackinac considered the cave to be a numinous location inhabited by bad spirits.  Allegedly, the spirits were cannibals who would capture and eat victims who ventured too close to the ill-omened location.

The cave is blackened with soot to this day, allegedly from the evil spirits' cooking fires; hence the name, 'Devil's Kitchen'.  It is not known whether these stories derive from actual Native American legend or were generated after the beginning of the tourism industry on Mackinac Island in the mid-19th century.

References

Caves of Michigan
Protected areas of Mackinac County, Michigan
Landforms of Mackinac County, Michigan
Mackinac Island State Park
Historic district contributing properties in Michigan
National Register of Historic Places in Mackinac County, Michigan
Natural features on the National Register of Historic Places in Michigan